Ancient astronauts have been addressed frequently in science fiction and horror fiction. Occurrences in the genres include:

Literature
 J.-H. Rosny aîné's Les Xipehuz [The Shapes] from 1887 features geometric aliens encountered by primitive humans living a thousand years before Babylonian times.
 Fred T. Jane's novel To Venus in Five Seconds (1897).
 Garrett P. Serviss' Edison's Conquest of Mars, published in 1898, is perhaps the first story to feature ancient astronauts who have a major influence on early human civilizations, predating Fort's book by over 20 years. In it, the narrator learns that the Martians from The War of the Worlds visited Earth around 7500 BC, enslaving the inhabitants of the Fertile Crescent and bringing them to Egypt to make monuments of their conquest, including the Giza pyramid complex and the Great Sphinx (which is actually the face of the leader of the Martian expedition). Afterwards, a plague caused them to leave, with the Martians taking a number of their human slaves to Mars to serve them there, until an expedition led by Thomas Edison freed their descendants in the early 20th century.
 The Barsoom series by Edgar Rice Burroughs.
 H. P. Lovecraft's "The Call of Cthulhu" (1926) and At the Mountains of Madness (1931) are some of the many works of the cosmic horror author that deal with ancient aliens.
 Robert E. Howard's short story "The Tower of the Elephant" (1933).
 Stanley G. Weinbaum's "Valley of Dreams" (1934) has an expedition to Mars discover that its bird-like natives, who refer to themselves as Thoth, visited Egypt approximately 15,000 BCE and were the inspiration for the Egyptian god of the same name, as well as the start of Egyptian writing. 
Eando Binder's short fiction series Via (1937-1942), published later as Puzzle of the Space Pyramids (1971).
 Edgard Armond's Os Exilados de Capela (1949), a spiritist book about beings coming from the Capella star to arrive on Earth in Prehistory, both the gods and Adam, the first man from the Genesis would have origins in Capella.
 Arthur C. Clarke has written several stories utilizing the theme, most famously in his 1953 short story "Encounter in the Dawn", which became the basis for the first section of 2001: A Space Odyssey in 1968. In his novel Rendezvous with Rama, a religion called the "Fifth Church of Christ, Cosmonaut" is mentioned, whose central tenet is that Jesus was an alien visitor. 
 Wilson Tucker's The Time Masters (1953) has a private detective who turns out to be Gilgamesh, who was a survivor of a starship crash thousands of years ago.
 Kurt Vonnegut's The Sirens of Titan (1959) depicts the whole of human development and civilization to be a medium used by aliens for relaying messages to an alien space-explorer stranded on one of Saturn's moons.
 The March 1961 issue of Analog Science Fiction and Science Fact contains a piece by Arthur W. Orton entitled The Four-Faced Visitors of Ezekiel. Although described in the magazine's Table of Contents as a short story, it actually takes the form of a pseudo-factual essay presenting a verse-by-verse analysis of Ezekiel's vision and interpreting this in terms of an encounter with ancient astronauts. In this respect the essay mirrors J. F. Blumrich's book The Spaceships of Ezekiel (1974), despite predating it by more than a decade.
 In Larry Niven's Known Space (1964–present), humanity is descended from aliens called the Pak.
 In Frederik Pohl's Heechee Saga (1972–2004), the Heechee are described as an ancient alien race that visited our solar system thousands of years ago. They left behind a variety of futuristic technology, which creates many interesting opportunities for Earth.
 In Alexander Kazantsev's novel "The destruction of Faena" (1974), Phaeton is destroyed  in a war between two aboriginal empires but survivors bring civilisation to Earth.
 An obscure novel by André Norton called Merlin's Mirror (1975) portrays the wizard Merlin as a servant of benevolent "Sky People" who seek to elevate humanity and thwart the "Dark Ones" who wish to keep humanity ignorant. Nimue is described as a servant of the Dark Ones, sent to prevent Merlin from giving humanity a leader (Arthur) who would bring it to the heights of knowledge. The Sky People are once implied to have assumed the guises of already-worshipped gods, such as Cernunnos, in order to communicate with humans, and sometimes are identified as divine by the human characters. Stonehenge is said to be their creation, and Merlin's reconstruction of it a means of establishing a "beacon" whereby the Sky People would find their way to Earth, avoiding their own extinction and humanity's limitation.
 In Walter Ernsting's The Day the Gods Died (1976), an extraterrestrial civilization is said to have built the ruins of ancient Peru.
 James P. Hogan wrote of an alien race which inhabited a destroyed fifth planet between Mars and Jupiter and are discovered in the hulk of an abandoned spacecraft on Ganymede in his five-volume Giants series (1977-2005).
 Douglas Adams used a satirical version of the theory in his Hitchhiker's Guide to the Galaxy series (1979–1992).
 Doris Lessing's Canopus in Argos series (1979-1983) describes the Earth from the view of two alien civilisations, responsible for bringing life to the planet.
 In David Brin's Uplift Universe series (1980-...), all known species were brought to sapience through the direct intervention of a known galactic "patron", except for the fabled first sentient species, the Progenitors, and humanity. While most humans take pride at achieving space travel without a patron, some humans (called Danikenites, after Erich von Däniken) and most Galactics believe otherwise.   
 Philip K. Dick explores this theory in his VALIS trilogy (1981), wherein race of ancient astronauts is thought to have placed an information-streaming satellite in orbit around Earth.
 In David Weber, Mutineers' Moon (1991), the Moon is a giant spaceship, which arrived 50,000 years ago.
 Buzz Aldrin's and John Barnes' novel, Encounter With Tiber (1996), deals with the discovery of ancient alien encounters on Earth and Mars, with humanity utilizing recovered alien technology to advance the space program.
 In the Outlanders novel series (1997-...) by Mark Ellis, the Anunnaki are revealed to have been the culprits behind a devastating nuclear war as well as the Root Race of the so-called Gray aliens.
 David Wisniewski's book The Secret Knowledge of Grown-Ups (1998) mentions in passing a hangar wherein employees of the United States Government "stack all the banged-up flying saucers", implying that the existence of such is well-known, but that the Government attempts to conceal it. In Jon Stewart's Naked Pictures of Famous People (1998), the section "The Recipe" claims to be a translation of an ancient Aztec text from 2000 BC depicting a celebrity awards ceremony. In the context of the book, Erich Von Daniken brought it to the world's attention in his book Weird, Huh? wondering if ancient alien visitors had brought knowledge of celebrity awards shows to the Aztecs.
 In William H. Keith Jr.'s Heritage Trilogy (1998-2000), a war between the United States and a United Europe (and later between the United States and China) has its roots in the discovery that ancient astronauts visited Earth on several occasions. Ancient technology found on Mars, the Moon, and Europa change the balance of power on Earth.
 A series of short novels known as the Outernet series (2002-...) has, as one of its premises, the idea that Stonehenge was originally built as a means of communication with extraterrestrials.
 S. M. Stirling's novels The Sky People (2006) and In the Courts of the Crimson Kings (2008) state that an ancient race of aliens populated Earth, Mars, and Venus with human and animal life. Additionally, the ancient astronaut theme is played in reverse, with the technologically advanced humans from Earth being seen as advanced gods by the Bronze Age-level alien natives of Venus and Mars.

 Comics 
The Mandarin's rings, a set of fictional weapons appearing in the Marvel Comics, were created by alien race known as Makluans. They were introduced in Tales of Suspense #50 ( February 1964), where the supervillain Mandarin found them, hidden inside of a wreckage spaceship.
The Kree alien species visited Earth in ancient times and conducted experiments on several humans, granting them superhuman abilities and turning them into Inhumans.
 The Adventures of Tintin comic  Flight 714 to Sydney by Hergé (1968) features a temple built to honor ancient astronauts and a scientist who acts as Earth's ambassador to them.
 The Marvel comic series The Eternals deals with advanced aliens (the Celestials) who had experimented on early hominids, creating two sister races, the Eternals and the Deviants, who resembled "gods" and "demons" respectively. It is also noted that their advanced test eventually lead to the X-gene in mutants.
 The Thorgal series by Grzegorz Rosiński and Van Hamme (29 albums) where the main protagonist Thorgal Aegirsson is in fact the son of ancient astronauts.
 A Japanese/American comic book series, Jason and the Argobots, portrayed the Egyptian Gods as extraterrestrials who became "teachers" to the people of ancient Egypt and who return to protect the Earth from a war between alien races.
 The plot of the Karmatrón y los Transformables sci-fi and fantasy comic series by Oscar González Loyo relies heavily on the ancient astronaut theory.
The Marvel Comics Asgardians are depicted as aliens in the comic series Earth X.

Television

 Nigel Kneale's miniseries Quatermass and the Pit (1958–1959) and the 1967 film adaptation used a version of the idea.
 The Star Trek franchise has dozens of examples of extraterrestrials visiting Earth in past centuries, many having an influence on pre-modern humans. These are just a few prime examples:
 The 1967 Star Trek: The Original Series episode "Who Mourns for Adonais?" uses the idea that the Greek gods were extraterrestrials, although the Sun god Apollo is the only mythological character to actually appear.
 The 1993 Star Trek: The Next Generation episode "The Chase" reveals that the predominance of humanoid species in known space of modern times is the result of a progenitor humanoid species "seeding" various planets with their DNA in order to influence the development of sentient life into forms similar to themselves.
 In the 1995 Star Trek: Voyager episode "Tattoo", it is revealed that the human character Chakotay is descended from the Rubber Tree People, a group of Native Americans who were visited by the Sky Spirits 45,000 years ago. The Sky Spirits, who are actually advanced, space-faring aliens, granted these primitive humans a genetic alteration which influenced their development.
 By contrast, in several other Trek projects, for example the Next Generation episode "Who Watches the Watchers", humans come to be regarded as gods by lesser advanced aliens. The United Federation of Planets and Starfleet have a Prime Directive of non interference to discourage this, but it happens often because of carelessness or malicious disobedience.
 The BBC, Doctor Who serial Pyramids of Mars (1975) featured a conflict on Earth between aliens of a race named the Osirans forming the basis of Egyptian mythology, and a number of other Doctor Who serials have used similar ideas.
 In the television series Space: 1999 (1975-1977), many alien species have controlled or visited Earth in the past, such as the Sanskrit-speaking Arkadians from "The Testament of Arkadia", that escaped from their planet and populated Earth, evolving into humans; the Tritonian space probes from "Ring Around the Moon" (isn't clear if there are Tritonians on their probes or if the probes are speaking intelligent beings), known during ancient history by the inhabitants of the Ancient Kingdom of Egypt.
 The original Battlestar Galactica and the 2003 remake depicts humans as having originated on the planet Kobol and later settled thirteen colony planets, Earth being the last and most distant. The plots of both concern a group of humans attempting to find Earth. The original 1978 series is more closely linked to the ancient astronaut theory, using modernized versions of ancient Greek, Egyptian, and Middle Ages costumes, as well as mixing ancient myths and religious materials into the storylines. In contrast, SyFy's 2003 remake deals little with ancient myths and legends and depicts an American-like culture, and in a twist, it is revealed that the "human" and Cylon protagonists are in fact the ancient astronauts themselves.
 In the Red Dwarf episode "Waiting for God" (1988), Rimmer states his belief in aliens having visited Earth in ancient times, asking Lister how else the pyramids could have been built. Lister replies, "They had massive whips, Rimmer. Massive, massive whips."
 In the Babylon 5 (1993-1998) universe, many of the First Ones, and in particular the Vorlons and Shadows, visited Earth (and the homeworlds of other races) at various times in history.
 The television series The X-Files (1993–2002, 2016–2018) has borrowed the theory.
 In the television series Earth: Final Conflict (1997-2002), the Atavus species traveled to Earth in the distant past and ruled over it, using Neanderthal men as slaves and a food source. The Atavus were present in Ancient Egypt as well. The Taelons (the series' main aliens) also visited Earth many times before initiating first contact in the mid-21st century.
 In the television series Space Island One (1998), the crew of the Unity encounter a Babylonian space probe, the Tower of Babel having been a rocket rather than a literal tower to reach the heavens.
 NTV, a television station in Newfoundland and Labrador, regularly shows programming centering around Captain Atlantis, an ancient astronaut espousing New Age philosophy, and his protégé, the human Captain Canada. Captain Atlantis is said to be part of a godlike race of ancient aliens from the far edges of the universe who settled in the city of Atlantis (which in the context of the story was located on the Grand Banks of Newfoundland); the rest of his race deliberately hid themselves and Atlantis from mankind to prevent humanity from using it for evil. By adopting New Age philosophies, Captain Atlantis claims humans can gain supernatural powers and eventually use them to achieve world peace. Captain Atlantis and Captain Canada stories are also featured in comic strip form in the Newfoundland Herald.

Anime and Manga

The Japanese anime television series The Super Dimension Fortress Macross (1982) featured an ancient, long extinct and very advanced humanoid alien civilization called The Protoculture, who dominated the Milky Way Galaxy by founding a Stellar Republic and who also created the human race on Earth.
 One of the Spriggan chapters depicts Tezcatlipoca as an ancient astronaut during a mission in Mexico.
 Yoshiki Takaya's manga series Bio Booster Armor Guyver, later adapted several times into animated form and twice into a pair of americanized films, featured the idea that all life on earth was created by an organization of various alien beings as biological weapons intended for use in interstellar war, which were later abandoned for reasons unknown, and thus were never taken into space. According to the series, human beings are actually a 'first stage' organism that can be further mutated into monstrous creatures called Zoanoids, which supposedly account for many modern-day myths of vampires and werewolves. The comic features an alien armor supposedly used by the aliens themselves which remains on Earth and is possessed by a high-school student. One of the principal characters, the most highly advanced living weapon, fears the aliens' return and plans to take mankind into space to find a means to confront the aliens on their own terms.
 Lilith and Adam in the manga/anime series Neon Genesis Evangelion were two extraterrestrial beings that landed on Earth and gave birth to humanity.

Western Animation

 In the animated series The Flintstones (1960-1966), leading character Fred is sometimes accompanied by Gazoo, a little green "space man" who exhibits many amazing powers.
 The French animated series Il était une fois... l'Espace (1982) (English: Once Upon a Time... Space) featured far-future humans taking on the role of superior aliens to an inca-like culture. The spaceships of the human civilization also used decorative iconography derived from the Nazca lines as a wink to the theory – the ship of the main characters using a hummingbird design.
 A 1984 episode of The New Scooby-Doo Mysteries is titled "Ghosts of the Ancient Astronauts," and revolves around alien artifacts discovered at an ancient South American temple. 
 The animated series The Transformers (1984-1987) depicts the Autobots and Decepticons as ancient astronauts crash-landing on Earth four million years ago. The Maximals and Predacons from the sequel series Beast Wars (1996-1999) take this theme one step further by time traveling to prehistoric Earth from the future (their present). They discover that another alien species called the Vok had already visited Earth, using it as an experiment which the Beast Wars had contaminated. Further examples are found in the  movie adaptations of this series.
 The episode "Sentinel" from the animated series Gargoyles (1994-1997) involves an ancient alien living in a hidden spaceship under Easter Island. In the episode it is concluded that this alien came to Earth long ago and inspired Moai statues which Easter Island is famous for.
 The basis for Prometheus and Bob (1996-2000) is an alien 900,000 years ago attempting to educate a caveman called "Bob", and creating video tapes of his failed attempts.Godzilla: The Series (1998-2000) featured grotesque ancient astronauts who had come to Earth during the late Jurassic period or early Cretaceous period and remained on Earth, under the ocean, ever since.
 In the animated series Dilbert (1999-2000), Dilbert and Dogbert visit a museum with an exhibit supporting the theory of aliens assisting the Egyptians in the construction of the Pyramid. When Dilbert asks what happened to the aliens after the pyramids were constructed, they move to the next exhibit, which depicts the Egyptians feasting on the aliens.
 The Futurama episode "A Pharaoh to Remember" (2002) features an alien culture that claims to have been taught space travel, mummification (for the purpose of scaring Abbott and Costello), and pyramid building by the ancient Egyptians (instead of this happening the other way around).
 In an episode of Martin Mystery (2003-2006), Martin, his stepsister, and his father are all captured by a Synth, a creature synthesized with human and alien genes (which was giving birth at the time). After looking at the cave paintings in the Synth's cave which seem to depict a UFO dropping off a strange creature on earth, Martin states it was abandoned by its "creators" some thousand years ago. It lived in secrecy until loggers got to its forest. In another episode of Martin Mystery, Martin, Java and Diana are sent to investigate paranormal activity at a summer camp. It was discovered that the culprit was Sauros, a reptilian god that demanded the life force of young people every thousand years. It was then discovered that Sauros was not a god but an extraterrestrial that had a thousand-year life cycle.

Film

 The idea of paleocontact appears in numerous science fiction stories and films, most notably in the first scene of the movie 2001: A Space Odyssey (1968).
 In the film Horror Express (1972), an extraterrestrial is found frozen for millions of years.
 In the film God Told Me To (1976), a character cites Jesus and Moses as alien visitors.
 While not specifically using Earth as an example, the fictional Star Wars universe has many references to aliens giving primitive races technology, or humans de-advancing into a more primitive society as time passes.
 Monty Python's Life of Brian (1979) includes a chase sequence where Brian briefly escapes from Roman legionaries by accidentally falling into an alien spaceship.
 The  Alien (1979-...) franchise features some examples. The Predator race from the movie Alien vs. Predator (2004) is described in the film as having traveled to Earth at a prehistoric time and having a human culture serve them as Gods. The film Prometheus (2012) is themed around a group of scientists who set out to discover the origins of human life, which was seeded on Earth and influenced by an ancient race of aliens.
 The film Hangar 18 (1980) involves a UFO whose symbols are found to match those used in ancient cultures.
 In The Thing (1982), an alien spacecraft crashes in Antarctica in 100,000 B.C.E. A character later mentions Chariots of the Gods? and the belief that the Incan civilization was developed by aliens.
 In Killer Klowns from Outer Space (1988) a character speculates that the titular monsters may have been ancient astronauts that came to Earth centuries earlier and inspired mankind to create the clown figure.
 In Moontrap (1989), the protagonists find a prehistoric base on the Moon, built by a human-looking species 14,000 years before.
 The movie Stargate (1994) featured Ra, a member of the alien species Goa'uld that came to Earth around 8000 B.C., who enslaved the ancient Egyptians, adopting their culture and religion and posing as their God, before eventually transporting thousands of them through the Stargate to offworld mining colonies. Spin-off television series Stargate SG-1 (1997–2007), Stargate Atlantis (2004–2009) and Stargate Universe (2009-2011) feature aliens called the Ancients (alternatively Alterans, Lanteans, or Anquietas) who are found to have traveled to Earth millions of years ago to start and influence human evolution. Also featured the sinister Goa'uld, who posed as gods to enslave the humans; and the benevolent Asgard, who posed as gods to protect the humans.The Stargate: Ultimate Edition: Director's Cut DVD includes a featurette interview with Erich von Däniken entitled "Is there a Stargate?".
 Mission to Mars (2000) is another movie with an "alien seeding" theme.
 The animated film Ice Age (2002) briefly shows an alien spacecraft trapped in ice during the ice age. In Ice Age: Collision Course (2016), the fifth film of the series, Scrat accidentally activates a spacecraft similar to the one from the first film and Buck discovers a building built by an advanced civilization that observed Sid in Ice Age: Dawn of the Dinosaurs (2009) and know astrophysics.
 The film Outlander (2008) is based on an advanced man from space crashing on Earth during the Viking era and remaining with the Vikings as their king.
 Indiana Jones and the Kingdom of the Crystal Skull (2008) links (albeit by coincidence) the existence of crystal skulls to beings that were perceived as gods by the Maya civilization, though these visitors were from another dimension rather than outer space.
 The Marvel Cinematic Universe (MCU) features numerous depictions of ancient astronauts, which have appeared before in the source material. (See Comics section above)
 The American independent film A Genesis Found (2009) features characters who use the theory to explain an anomalous skeleton discovered at the Moundville Archaeological Site in central Alabama.
 The film The Fourth Kind (2009) mentions the idea that aliens contacted the ancient Sumerians and apparently features aliens speaking the Sumerian language.
 The film Beyond the Sky (2018) features an ancient astronaut.

Documentaries
 Chariots of the Gods (1970)
 In Search of Ancient Astronauts (1973)
 In Search of Ancient Mysteries (1974)
 The Outer Space Connection (1975)

 Music 
 Lynsey De Paul's  Just Visiting speculates that spacemen visited prehistoric man and gave continued guidance in mankind's development, and that we might find ourselves in the same position some day.
 Chris de Burgh's A Spaceman Came Travelling deals with the concept of an ancient astronaut, in this case pertaining to the Christ story.
 Frank Zappa's "Inca Roads" (from the album One Size Fits All) deals with Ancient Astronaut Theory. The primary lyric is "Did a vehicle come from somewhere out there just to land in the Andes? Was it round, and did it have a motor, or was it something different? Did a vehicle fly along the mountain and find a place to park itself, or did someone build a place to leave a space for such a thing to land?"
 Several songs by Philadelphia-based rap group The Lost Children of Babylon deal with ancient astronaut theory, explicitly stating that "Jesus Christ was really an ancient astronaut". The debut album, The Psycho-Social, Chemical, Biological & Electro-Magnetic Manipulation of Human Consciousness by the hip hop group Jedi Mind Tricks, features the Lost Children of Babylon and also promotes ancient astronaut theories.
 A post-rock musical group God Is an Astronaut from Ireland have a name exploiting the theory.
 Most of the Ayreon albums are about ancient astronauts, that go by the name Forever, who traveled from the Andromeda Galaxy to earth long ago and influenced the development of science and technology.

Video games
 The game Spore has many elements of ancient astronauts, even giving player the ability to manipulate other less developed species as a space travelling species.
 Final Fantasy VII features an ancient astronaut, Jenova, as the main antagonist who gives rise to Sephiroth and SOLDIER.
 The American computer game SPY Fox: Some Assembly Required playfully showed a flying saucer buried beneath the world's fair.
 In the Halo series, ancient humanity was a spacefaring society technologically superior to modern humanity, with many worlds colonized and contact established with several alien species. After losing a large-scale war with slightly more technologically advanced, but more wide spread species, the Forerunners, humanity was stripped of their technologies and quarantined to Earth, their home planet. For millennia, the Forerunners exercised influence over humanity's behavior, evolution, and even memories. When an invasive parasitic species threatened all sentient life, the Forerunners eventually decided that their only option was to sterilize the galaxy. Though they established automated preservation and "reseeding" technologies in order to reestablish humans and many other species across the galaxy after the sterilization, the Forerunners sacrificed themselves in order to see the plan through. Later, some of the alien species discovered remnants of Forerunner technology. While they derived many technological innovations from the artifacts, they also misinterpreted much of what they found and worshipped the extinct Forerunners as gods. Eventually regaining spacefaring technology, humans studied the Forerunner artifacts with a more scientific approach. Both the alien species and humanity were surprised to discover that the Forerunners granted humanity alone stewardship over the technology they had been left behind. The reasons for this were only made clear in the most recent novels and Halo 4. The Forerunners themselves were created by aliens far more ancient, of which the Forerunners had only a mythological understanding of.
 Dark Void features a race of humanoid shape-shifters called Watchers, who ruled over ancient humans as gods, bringing technology and civilization to Earth. Their human subjects rebelled, and exiled them to the titular Dark Void, an alternate dimension that exists between Earth and the original Watcher homeworld.
 In the game Mass Effect humanity discovers a cache of alien technology buried on Mars, built by an alien species known as the Protheans. The Protheans had apparently maintained a vast interstellar empire encompassing the entirety of the Milky Way; the empire collapsed suddenly and mysteriously 50,000 years ago, leaving almost no traces of its existence. It is revealed later in the game that the Protheans, along with numerous interstellar civilizations before them, had been systematically exterminated by a race of artificially intelligent machines called Reapers.
 The arcade shoot-em-up Xevious (from Namco 1983, designed by Masanobu Endō) were also deeply inspired on ancient astronaut theories.
 In the Assassin's Creed franchise, it is gradually revealed that humanity was originally created as a slave race by the then-ruling people tentatively known as the "First Civilization" thousands of years prior to the games' settings. Humanity eventually revolted against their "gods" and full-scale war erupted. This race, as well as humans, were nearly wiped out by a solar flare, forcing the two to compromise a truce to ensure the survival of both. The First Civilization have since, as a distinct species, become extinct, though hybrid bloodlines of the two species still exist; their presence in history has been erased, leaving behind only remnants of their technology (known as "Pieces of Eden"), which became powerful weapons and religious artifacts (the reason behind the Templars' and the Assassins' ongoing war). However, the First Civilization did not originate from outer space, having resided on the Earth and evolved over time. In later games, the true name of the race that the First Civilization belongs to is revealed to be "Isu", and several Isu are shown to still be alive in modern times, either in digital form (such as Juno and Minerva), or by reincarnating themselves as humans (as is the case with Aita, who, at various points in history, has been reincarnated as Jacques de Molay, Bartholomew Roberts, and François-Thomas Germain, among others). These humans are known as "Sages", and possess a higher concentration of Isu DNA than other hybrids, as well as memories of their past lives, which often come in the form of visions or the Isu directly speaking to them in their minds. 
 The Cuotl in Rise of Nations: Rise of Legends is a nation of Mesoamerica-inspired tribes subjugated by four extraterrestrial beings who install themselves as deities.
 Catherine'': in the Rin ending of the game, it is revealed that Rin is an ET from a different planet.

References

External links
 Ancient Aliens in Science Fiction Movies - Part One
 Ancient Aliens in Science Fiction Movies - Part Two

 
Extraterrestrial life in popular culture
New religious movements in popular culture
Prehistoric life in popular culture